Cosmas of Prague (– October 21, 1125) was a priest, writer and historian.

Life
Between 1075 and 1081, he studied in Liège. After his return to Bohemia, he married Božetěcha, with whom he had a son named Hermann or Zdic and remained in minor orders. His son later became Bishop of Olomouc. In 1094, he was ordained a deacon, and in 1099, he was ordained a priest at Esztergom in Hungary

Works 
His magnum opus, written in Latin, is called Chronica Boemorum. The Chronica is divided into three books:
The first book, completed in 1119, starts with the creation of the world and ends in the year 1038. It describes the legendary foundation of the Bohemian state by the oldest Bohemians around the year 600 (Duke Czech, Duke Krok and his three daughters), Duchess Libuše and the foundation of Přemyslid dynasty by her marriage with Přemysl, old bloody wars, Duke Bořivoj and the introduction of Christianity in Bohemia, Saint Wenceslaus and his grandmother Saint Ludmila, reign of the three Boleslavs, the life of Saint Adalbert and bloody wars after year 1000.
The second book describes Bohemian history for the years 1038–1092. The book starts with the heroic deeds of Duke Břetislav, known as the "Bohemian Achilles", for example with his victory over Poland. The Chronica also describes the long and great reign of King Vratislav, who was known as a forceful ruler but a brave and good man. There is also a reflection on his wars in Italy; this book ends with Vratislav's death.
The third book (1092–1125) starts with a description of the time of instability and bloody civil wars after Vratislav's death between years 1092 and 1109. The Chronica ends with the reign of Vladislav between 1109 and 1125. The same year, 1125, Cosmas died.

In the later 12th and 13th centuries, Cosmas's continuators brought his history down to 1283.

References

Literature

External links

Chronica Boemorum — the chronicle accessible on-line at Monumenta Germaniae Historica
Cosmas biography 
English translation of the chronicle by Lisa Wolverton published by Catholic University of America Press

1040s births
1125 deaths
Chroniclers
12th-century historians from the Holy Roman Empire
Czech literature
Bohemian literature
Czech male writers
12th-century Latin writers
Writers from Prague